The 2001–02 División de Honor de Hockey Patines was the 33rd season of the top-tier league of rink hockey in Spain.

Barcelona finished the league as champion, after beating Igualada 3–0 in the finals.

Competition format
Sixteen teams joined the league and the eight first qualified teams at the end of the regular season joined the playoffs.

The three last teams were relegated to Primera División.

Regular season

Playoffs
The quarterfinals were played with a best-of-three format, while semifinals and final were played with a best-of-five series.

Seeded teams played games 1 and 3 of the quarterfinals and 1, 2 and 5 of the semifinals and finals at home.

Source:

Final standings

Copa del Rey

The 2003 Copa del Rey was the 59th edition of the Spanish men's roller hockey cup. It was played in Vic between the seven first qualified teams after the first half of the season and Vic as host team.

Barcelona won their 14th trophy.

References

External links
Real Federación Española de Patinaje

OK Liga seasons
2001 in roller hockey
2002 in roller hockey
2001 in Spanish sport
2002 in Spanish sport